In geometry, the octagrammic prism is one of an infinite set of nonconvex prisms formed by square sides and two regular star polygon caps, in this case two octagrams.

Prismatoid polyhedra